Permas Jaya Bridge or Jambatan Permas Jaya (Jawi: جمبتن ڤرمس جاي) is a river bridge in arch shape in Plentong, Johor Bahru District, Johor, Malaysia. The bridge crosses Tebrau River and Plentong River. The bridge is built to shorten the travel distance between Bandar Baru Permas Jaya to Johor bahru city area from 18 km (estimated) to 6 km (estimated). The bridge was once the longest Arch bridge in Southeast Asia in 1994, which is about 1.5 km long.

History
The construction of the bridge was proposed when Bandar Baru Permas Jaya, a new neighborhood town was first launched by the property company Bandar Raya Developments Berhad (BRDB) in 1984, however, the bridge was only completed in 1994.

The new second Permas Jaya Bridge
The construction of the new second Permas Jaya Bridge was proposed in 2006 under the Iskandar Development Region plan. Construction started in February 2008.

The bridge was completed and opened to road users on 1 March 2012.

See also
Permas Jaya

1994 establishments in Malaysia
Bridges completed in 1994
Bridges in Johor
Buildings and structures in Johor Bahru
Transport in Johor Bahru